Elliot Goldenthal scored the 1994 film Interview with the Vampire, working again with director and frequent collaborator Neil Jordan.

The score
The music is characterized by its full, dramatic sound that complements the film's gothic atmosphere. The classical style helps to coveys the dark emotional struggles of the characters.

The rock band Guns N' Roses covered the Rolling Stones song "Sympathy for the Devil", which plays during the film's end credits. The song was released as a single CD was also released, with "Escape to Paris" as a B side.

The album was nominated for the Academy Award and the Golden Globe Award for Best Original Score, losing on both counts to the score of The Lion King.

Track listing 
 "Libera Me" (2:47) - (Vocals: The American Boychoir)
 "Born to Darkness Part I" (3:04)
 "Lestat's Tarantella" (0:46)
 "Madeleine's Lament" (3:06)
 "Claudia's Allegro" Agitato (4:46)
 "Escape to Paris" (3:09)
 "Marche Funèbre" (1:50)
 "Lestat's Recitative" (3:39)
 "Santiago's Waltz" (0:37)
 "Théâtre Des Vampires" (1:18)
 "Armand's Seduction" (1:51)
 "Plantation Pyre" (1:59)
 "Forgotten Lore" (0:31)
 "Scent of Death" (1:40)
 "Abduction & Absolution" (4:42) - (Vocals: The American Boychoir)
 "Armand Rescues Louis" (2:07)
 "Louis' Revenge" (2:36)
 "Born to Darkness Part II" (1:11)
 "Sympathy for the Devil" (7:35) - (cover by Guns N' Roses)

Crew/Credit
Music Composed by Elliot Goldenthal (except track 19)
Music Produced by Matthias Gohl
Orchestrated by Robert Elhai and Elliot Goldenthal
Conducted by Jonathan Sheffer
Recorded and Mixed by Steve McLaughlin and Joel Iwataki
Electronic Music Produced by Richard Martinez
Music Editors: Michael Connell and Chris Brooks

References

External links
 
 

Horror film soundtracks
1994 soundtrack albums
Elliot Goldenthal soundtracks